Falls Township is a suburban Philadelphia township in Bucks County, Pennsylvania. The population was 34,300 at the 2010 census.  Portions of Fairless Hills and Levittown, Pennsylvania, are located in the township. Portions of Falls Township are called Morrisville and Yardley, due to the location of the Morrisville Post Office outside the Borough of Morrisville in Falls Township. As originally chartered in 1692, the villages of Morrisville and Tullytown were part of Falls Township. Morrisville was granted borough status in 1804. Tullytown was erected as a borough in 1891.

History
Dutch settlements here were established as early as 1616. A number of colonists came to Falls Township before William Penn founded Pennsylvania in 1681, including William Biles.

Fallsington is the only settlement of this period which has been in continuous use. Fallsington is an example of a crossroads village typical of the time. The Bucks County Courthouse, established in 1663, is said to have been located in Fallsington until it was moved to Bristol in 1705. Also in 1690, Thomas Janney donated  of land to be used as the Quaker burial grounds for Falls Monthly Meeting. The township itself was established in 1692. Numerous villages were located within the township, with Fallsington being the center of social and commercial activity in the township. Morrisville was another prominent village, until it was partitioned as a borough in 1804. Tullytown was also a village until it was partitioned as a borough in 1891.

Villages and other place names, past and present, include Dogtown, Fairless Hills, Fallsington, Kildorpy, Kirkbridesville, Levittown, Morningside, Oxford Valley (located in both Falls Township and Middletown Township, Penns Manor, Penn Valley, Slickville, Tyburn, and Wheatsheaf.

The growth of Fallsington continued, with the construction of homes, an inn, public buildings, stores, and small craftsmen's shops. Until the construction of Fairless Hills and Levittown, it was the largest village in the township, and functioned for many years as a commercial center.

In 1682, William Penn began construction of his official residence, Pennsbury Manor. The  site in Falls Township was chosen for its easy access to Philadelphia along the Delaware River. This island was gradually sold by Penn's heirs and the last original building was destroyed in 1864. In 1932, a small portion of the original site was purchased by Pennsylvania and reconstruction of Pennsbury Manor was begun. Pennsbury is now a historical site, open to the public.  It was listed on the National Register of Historic Places in 1969.

The proximity of major transportation systems influenced much of the township's development. The earliest of these was the Delaware River. The township is located at the upper end of the navigable portion of the river. In 1686, the Provincial Council ordered the construction of the King's Highway, which ran from Philadelphia to Trenton along an existing Indian trail, through Bristol, Falls, and Morrisville. The King's Highway still exists today as U.S. Route 13, flowing closely the original configuration. Additional roads and turnpikes were built in the 18th and early 19th centuries.

Other transportation systems were laid out through Falls Township in the 19th and early 20th centuries. The Delaware Canal from Easton to Bristol was opened in 1832. A railroad line from Philadelphia to Trenton via Morrisville was built between 1833 and 1835. The rail line became part of Pennsylvania Railroad's main New York-Philadelphia line. The "West Trenton" cut-off of the Pennsylvania Railroad was built through the northern part of the township at the end of 19th century. These rail lines now accommodate SEPTA, Amtrak, and CONRAIL passenger and freight between Philadelphia and Trenton.

Geography
Natural features include Biles Island, Common Creek, Martins Creek, Mint Island, Queen Anne Creek, Scotts Creek, and Turkey Hill. Falls Township contains the easternmost point of Pennsylvania's southern half.

Demographics

As of the 2010 census, the township was 84.1% Non-Hispanic White, 5.8% Black or African American, 0.2% Native American, 4.2% Asian, and 2.1% were two or more races. 4.4% of the population were of Hispanic or Latino ancestry

As of the census of 2000, there were 34,865 people, 13,170 households, and 9,403 families residing in the township.  The population density was 1,565.0 people per square mile (604.2/km2).  There were 13,528 housing units at an average density of 607.2/sq mi (234.4/km2).  The racial makeup of the township was 90.22% White, 4.89% African American, 0.16% Native American, 2.58% Asian, 0.02% Pacific Islander, 0.77% from other races, and 1.37% from two or more races. Hispanic or Latino of any race were 2.35% of the population.

There were 13,170 households, out of which 35.1% had children under the age of 18 living with them, 54.5% were married couples living together, 12.1% had a female householder with no husband present, and 28.6% were non-families. 23.4% of all households were made up of individuals, and 9.0% had someone living alone who was 65 years of age or older.  The average household size was 2.64 and the average family size was 3.15.

In the township the population was spread out, with 25.8% under the age of 18, 7.9% from 18 to 24, 31.8% from 25 to 44, 21.8% from 45 to 64, and 12.7% who were 65 years of age or older.  The median age was 36 years. For every 100 females, there were 94.9 males.  For every 100 females age 18 and over, there were 92.1 males.

The median income for a household in the township was $50,129, and the median income for a family was $57,033. Males had a median income of $41,200 versus $30,117 for females. The per capita income for the township was $22,376.  About 3.7% of families and 5.5% of the population were below the poverty line, including 5.9% of those under age 18 and 4.8% of those age 65 or over.

Transportation

U.S. Route 1 is the most prominent highway serving Falls Township, following a freeway along an east-west alignment across the northern portion of the township. U.S. Route 13 also follows a freeway through the township on a north-south alignment, terminating at US 1. U.S. Route 1 Business follows the Lincoln Highway to the south of US 1's routing in the northwestern section of the township. Pennsylvania Route 32 begins at the US 1 freeway in the northeastern section of the township, heading northeastward along Bridge Street.

SEPTA provides Suburban Bus service to Falls Township along Route 127, which runs between the Oxford Valley Mall and the Trenton Transit Center, and Route 128, which runs between the Neshaminy Mall and the Oxford Valley Mall. Amtrak's Northeast Corridor and SEPTA Regional Rail's Trenton Line pass through the township but do not have any stations within it. The nearest SEPTA Regional Rail stations are Levittown station and Trenton Transit Center, with the latter station also serving Amtrak and NJ Transit.

Climate
According to the Köppen climate classification system, Falls Township has a Humid subtropical climate (Cfa). Cfa climates are characterized by all months having an average mean temperature > , at least four months with an average mean temperature ≥ , at least one month with an average mean temperature ≥  and no significant precipitation difference between seasons. Although most summer days are slightly humid in Falls Township, episodes of heat and high humidity can occur with heat index values > . The average wettest month is July which corresponds with the annual peak in thunderstorm activity. Episodes of extreme cold and wind can occur with wind chill values < . Ice storms and large snowstorms depositing ≥  occur once every few years, particularly during nor’easters from December through February.

Ecology
According to the A. W. Kuchler U.S. potential natural vegetation types, Falls Township would have a dominant vegetation type of Appalachian Oak (104) with a dominant vegetation form of Eastern Hardwood Forest (25). The spring bloom typically begins by April 8 and fall color usually peaks by November 3.

References

External links

 Falls Township

Pennsylvania populated places on the Delaware River
Townships in Bucks County, Pennsylvania
Townships in Pennsylvania